Rhabdolaimidae is a family of nematodes belonging to the order Araeolaimida.

Genera:
 Mediolaimus Tahseen, Sultana, Khan & Hussain, 2012
 Rhabdolaimus de Man, 1880
 Rogerus Hoeppli & Chu, 1934
 Syringolaimus de Man, 1888
 Udonchus Cobb, 1913

References

Nematode families